Takab or Tekab is a city in the Central District of Takab County, West Azerbaijan province, Iran, and serves as capital of the county. At the 2006 census, its population was 43,702 in 10,078 households. The following census in 2011 counted 44,040 people in 11,749 households. The latest census in 2016 showed a population of 49,677 people in 14,369 households.

The famous historical complex Takht-e Soleyman is situated to the North-East of the city. Takht-e-Soleyman was one of Takab's oldest Zoroastrian fire temples during the Sassanid Dynasty and had the name Azargoshnasp. The Karaftu Cave is also situated in Takab near Saqqez.

Etymology
Shiz is the ancient name used during Persian Empire for Takab. Takab means one narrow water way in Persian language. Tak means one or alone and Ab means water. Takab was originally known as Tikan Təpə by its native Turkic Afshar people until 1941 when Iran's Academy of Persian Language and Literature officially changed it to Takab. Afshar people are one of the Oghuz Turkic peoples. These originally nomadic Oghuz tribes moved from Central Asia and initially settled in Iranian Azerbaijan, Azerbaijan republic, and Eastern Turkey. Later some of them were relocated by the Safavids to Khorasan and Mazandaran.

People
The predominant language spoken in the city is Azerbaijani, while the predominant religion is Shia Islam. Minority Kurdish tribes include Shekak, Sharani, Moslanlu and Zafranlu, while most of the Azerbaijani population is of the Afshar tribe. The Azerbaijanis have also been described as 'Turkmans'.

Economy
The majority of residents of Takab earn their income from agriculture. Takab is home to the biggest gold mine in the entire country and one of the biggest in the Middle East.

Notable people
 Shahriar Afshar, Iranian-American physicist and inventor.
 Esmaeil Zolfi, Iranian businessman and philanthropist.

References 

Takab County

Cities in West Azerbaijan Province

Populated places in West Azerbaijan Province

Populated places in Takab County

Kurdish settlements in West Azerbaijan Province